Micromania may refer to:
 Micromania (video game retailer), a French video game retailer
 Micromanía, a Spanish computer game magazine
 "Micromania", a song by Romina Contiero
 Micromania (moth), a synonym of the moth genus Anthracia